The Vall de Núria Rack Railway is a mountain railway in the Pyrenees mountains in the north of the Catalonia region of Spain. The line connects Ribes de Freser with Queralbs and Vall de Núria in Ripollès, Girona. As Queralbs is the highest point in the valley reachable by road, the rack railway is – along with the old footpath / mule track – the only way to reach the shrine and ski resort at Núria.

The line opened on March 22, 1931, and has been electrically operated from the start. It became part of the Ferrocarrils de la Generalitat de Catalunya (FGC) on January 2, 1984 and remains in their ownership. The line connects to the main R3 line at Ribes de Freser, but the stations have separate access.

The first  of the line is operated by conventional rail adhesion. The remainder of the line is operated as a rack railway, using the Abt system and with a maximum gradient of 15%. The line is electrified with an overhead supply at 1500 V DC.

Three generations of rolling stock exist on the line. The original stock consisted of passenger cars hauled by four six-wheeled electric locomotives, numbered E1-E4, built by SLM and BBC in 1930–31. They were supplemented by four two-car electric trains numbered A5-A8, built by SLM and BBC in 1985.

The final generation is represented by two low-floor electric motor coaches of type Stadler GTW and numbered A10-A11, built by Stadler Rail in Switzerland in 2003. The line also owns a diesel rack locomotive, D9, used on works trains and to push the snow plough.

Cars A10 and A11 are identical to the rolling stock of the Montserrat Rack Railway. The Montserrat line is also owned by the FGC and some stock is shared between the lines. Locomotive E4 is transferred for use on work trains.

Rolling stock
Rolling stock of the Montserrat Rack Railway are listed, if they are or were also used in Vall Núria

**) Original roster, built by Vereinigte Westdeutsche Waggonfabrik A.G., is said to have been formed of Affw 2, ABffw 11–15, Bffw 21–28 and Aaffw 51. However, box car 01 was rebuilt from Affw 1 and there was a Bffw 29; at the same time ABffw 13–15 and Bffw 26 were off the roster.

See also
List of highest railways in Europe

References

External links 

Vall de Núria Rack Railway website
Vall de Núria Rack Railway at Finding the Universe

Mountain railways
Metre gauge railways in Spain
Rack railways in Catalonia
Transport in Ripollès
Pyrenees